Rivellia is a genus of signal flies (insects in the family Platystomatidae). There are at least 140 described species in Rivellia.

See also
 List of Rivellia species

References

 
Diptera of Africa
Muscomorph flies of Europe
Platystomatidae
Articles containing video clips
Tephritoidea genera
Taxa named by Jean-Baptiste Robineau-Desvoidy